Tritia nitida is a species of sea snail, a marine gastropod mollusk in the family Nassariidae, the nassa mud snails or dog whelks.

Distribution
This species occurs in European waters and in the Alboran Sea.

Description
The length of the shell varies between 24 mm and 33 mm.

References

 Salis Marschlins C. U. von (1793). Reisen in verschieden Provinzen den Königreischs Neapel. Zurich and Leipzig, Ziegler Vol. I: pp. 442 + 10 pl.
 Coen, G. (1914). Contributo allo studio della fauna malacologica adriatica. Memorie del Regio Comitato Talassografico Italiano. 46: 3-34, pl. 1-7
 Coen G. (1933). Saggio di una Sylloge Molluscorum Adriaticorum. Memorie del Regio Comitato Talassografico Italiano 192: pp. i-vii, 1-186
 Vassel E. (1880). Sur les faunes de l'isthme de Suez. . Bulletin de la Société d'Histoire Naturelle d'Autun 3: 21-104
 de Kluijver, M.J.; Ingalsuo, S.S.; de Bruyne, R.H. (2000). Macrobenthos of the North Sea [CD-ROM]: 1. Keys to Mollusca and Brachiopoda. World Biodiversity Database CD-ROM Series. Expert Center for Taxonomic Identification (ETI): Amsterdam, The Netherlands. . 1 cd-rom pp
 Gofas, S.; Le Renard, J.; Bouchet, P. (2001). Mollusca, in: Costello, M.J. et al. (Ed.) (2001). European register of marine species: a check-list of the marine species in Europe and a bibliography of guides to their identification. Collection Patrimoines Naturels, 50: pp. 180–213
 Muller, Y. (2004). Faune et flore du littoral du Nord, du Pas-de-Calais et de la Belgique: inventaire. [Coastal fauna and flora of the Nord, Pas-de-Calais and Belgium: inventory]. Commission Régionale de Biologie Région Nord Pas-de-Calais: France. 307 pp

External links
 Jeffreys J.G. (1862-1869). British conchology. Vol. 1: pp. cxiv + 341 (1862). Vol. 2: pp. 479 (1864). Vol. 3: pp. 394 (1865). Vol. 4: pp. 487 (1867). Vol. 5: pp. 259 (1869). London, van Voorst.
 Locard, A. (1887). Contributions à la faune malacologique française. X. Monographie des espèces de la famille des Buccinidae. Annales de la Société Linnéenne de Lyon. 33: 17-127, 1 pl
 Mörch, O. A. L. (1852-1853). Catalogus conchyliorum quae reliquit D. Alphonso d'Aguirra & Gadea Comes de Yoldi, Regis Daniae Cubiculariorum Princeps, Ordinis Dannebrogici in Prima Classe & Ordinis Caroli Tertii Eques. Fasc. 1, Cephalophora, 170 pp. (1852); Fasc. 2, Acephala, Annulata, Cirripedia, Echinodermata, 74 (+2) pp. (1853). Hafniae [Copenhagen: L. Klein.]
 Locard, A. (1887). Contributions à la faune malacologique française. X. Monographie des espèces de la famille des Buccinidae. Annales de la Société Linnéenne de Lyon. 33: 17-127, 1 pl
 Risso, A. (1826-1827). Histoire naturelle des principales productions de l'Europe Méridionale et particulièrement de celles des environs de Nice et des Alpes Maritimes. Paris, F.G. Levrault. 3(XVI): 1-480, 14 pls
 Bucquoy E., Dautzenberg P. & Dollfus G. (1882-1886). Les mollusques marins du Roussillon. Tome Ier. Gastropodes. Paris: Baillière & fils. 570 pp., 66 pls.
 Gofas, S.; Luque, Á. A.; Templado, J.; Salas, C. (2017). A national checklist of marine Mollusca in Spanish waters. Scientia Marina. 81(2) : 241-254, and supplementary online material
 

Nassariidae
Gastropods described in 1867
Taxa named by John Gwyn Jeffreys